George Sachs (April 5, 1896 – October 30, 1960) was a Russian-born German and American metallurgist.

Born in Moscow, he taught at Frankfurt University (1930-1935), and the Case Institute of Technology (now Case Western Reserve University, CWRU; him since 1942)

He was of Jewish birth, and left Germany with his family in 1937 to escape Nazi persecution, and settled in the United States. He was the father of the astronomer Rainer K. Sachs.

Works 
 Praktische Metallkunde, 1933

External links 

1896 births
1960 deaths
Scientists from Moscow
German metallurgists
20th-century German chemists
20th-century American chemists
Russian Jews
Jewish emigrants from Nazi Germany to the United States